Red Jacket was a clipper ship, one of the largest and fastest ever built. She was also the first ship of the White Star Line company. She was named after Sagoyewatha, a famous Seneca Indian chief, called "Red Jacket" by settlers. She was designed by Samuel Hartt Pook, built by George Thomas in Rockland, Maine, and launched in 1853, the last ship to be launched from this yard.

Voyages
On her first voyage, Red Jacket set the speed record for sailing ships crossing the Atlantic by traveling from New York to Liverpool in 13 days, 1 hour, 25 minutes, dock to dock.

She left Rockland under tow, and was rigged in New York. Her captain was a veteran packet ship commander, Asa Eldridge of Yarmouth, Massachusetts, and she had a crew of 65.

A Collins Line steamer arriving in Liverpool (which had left New York two days before Red Jacket) reported that Red Jacket was just astern. As she entered the harbor, tugs tried to get lines aboard the clipper but she was traveling too fast. Thousands, alerted by the Collins Liner, watched as Eldridge shortened sail and backed the vessel into its berth.

A few days after the Red Jacket’s arrival in Liverpool, the accuracy of the ship’s log—and thus the integrity of her captain—was questioned in a letter to The Times of London, arguably the world’s most important newspaper at the time. The letter came from a highly authoritative source, Lloyd’s of London, but was signed only with the author’s initials. It prompted a fierce rebuttal the following day from a second correspondent who also did not disclose his name, but was clearly American. Three days later, the final word in this correspondence went to Asa Eldridge himself; The Times printed a letter from him (sent in his own name) in which he patiently explained why the original correspondent was wrong in his interpretation of the ship’s log.

At Liverpool, the Red Jacket had her bottom coppered and cabins fitted out for the Australian immigrant trade. She was purchased by Pilkington & Wilcox and other Liverpool investors with registry changing on April 24, 1854. (Most secondary sources say that the vessel was bought by the British a year later, copying a mistake made by earlier historians.) She was then chartered by the White Star Line for a run to Melbourne, Victoria. Under Captain Samuel Reid (who owned 1/16 of her), she reached in Melbourne in 69 days. Only one clipper, James Baines, ever made the run faster. On 13 June 1859, whilst on a voyage from Liverpool to Melbourne, she collided with the British merchant ship Elizabeth Walker, which sank. Red Jacket rescued the crew of Elizabeth Walker, which was on a voyage from Buenos Aires, Argentina to London.

Red Jacket  served in the immigrant trade until 1867, when she became an Australian and Indian coastal freighter.. In May 1871, she ran aground at Cantick Head, Orkney Islands whilst on a voyage from Calcutta to Dundee, Forfarshire. She was refloated and completed her voyage.

Fate of the ship
In 1872 Red Jacket became a lumber carrier from Quebec to London, joining the clippers Marco Polo and Donald McKay, which "ended their days" in the transatlantic Quebec timber trade, She collided with the Eliza Walker in 1878, which sank; Eliza Walker′s crew were rescued. On 29 January 1878, she put in to Plymouth, Devon in a leaky condition, her crew refusing to proceed. She was recorded as a collier on a voyage from Newcastle upon Tyne, Northumberland to Genoa, Italy. In 1883, Red Jacket was sold to Blandy Brothers, a Portuguese shipping company in the Madeira Islands as a coaling hulk. She dragged her anchors in a heavy gale and was driven ashore on 16 December 1885; the sale of her wreckage fetched just £113.

References

Further reading

External links
 
 Era of the Clipper Ships, the Red Jacket

Images and models
History & Painting of Red Jacket by Percy A. Sanborn
Red Jacket in the ice off Cape Horn Currier and Ives print, with less color, Springfield Museum
Red Jacket ship model
"Clipper Ship Red Jacket" watercolor by David J. Kennedy

Clippers
Individual sailing vessels
Age of Sail merchant ships of the United States
Victorian-era passenger ships of the United Kingdom
History of immigration to Australia
Ships of the White Star Line
Ships built in Rockland, Maine
Merchant ships of Portugal
Lumber ships
Barges
Coal hulks
Maritime incidents in June 1859
Maritime incidents in May 1871
Maritime incidents in 1878
Maritime incidents in December 1885
1853 ships